Anna-Maria Teresa Nasuelli (born 19 July 1947) is an Italian former professional tennis player.

Nasuelli, a right-handed player, played in six Federation Cup ties for Italy, including a quarter-final against Australia in 1972. She twice reached the third round of the singles at the French Open, including in 1974 when she was also a doubles semi-finalist, partnering Raquel Giscafré.

See also
List of Italy Fed Cup team representatives

References

External links
 
 
 

1947 births
Living people
Italian female tennis players